Edward George Irving (1816–1855) was a Scottish surgeon who served in the Royal Navy.  He was also a collector of plants, and the plant family Irvingiaceae, and genus Irvingia are named after him.

Marriage and Family
He married Lucy Elizabeth Haynes Morrell, second daughter of Arthur, a British naval officer and Elizabeth, on 25 July 1848, at Kingston, Portsmouth, Hampshire.

Their children were Edward Arthur Irving, who became an archdeacon in Canada, Minnie Irving, and John Henry Irving.

References

Scottish botanists
Plant collectors
Scottish sailors
1816 births
1855 deaths
Scottish surgeons
Royal Navy Medical Service officers
Place of birth missing
19th-century Scottish medical doctors
19th-century British botanists